Rosalind Belben is an English novelist. She was born in 1941 in Dorset where she now lives, in Bere Regis. She is a Fellow of the Royal Society of Literature. Her novel Our Horses in Egypt won the James Tait Black Award in 2007. Among her other books are Bogies, Reuben Little Hero, The Limit, Dreaming of Dead People, and Hound Music.

Lynne Segal described her as a "somewhat neglected author and elegant stylist", and praised Dreaming of Dead People.

Novels
Bogies (1972)
Reuben Little Hero (1973)
The Limit (1974)
Dreaming of Dead People (1979)
Is Beauty Good (1989)
Choosing Spectacles (1995) 
Hound Music (2001)
Our Horses in Egypt (2007)

References

External links
 Rosalind Belben « Interview « ReadySteadyBook - for literature...
 The Work of Rosalind Belben, article by MJ Fitzgerald in Rain Taxi Review, 2002

English women novelists
1941 births
Living people
Writers from Dorset
James Tait Black Memorial Prize recipients
Fellows of the Royal Society of Literature
People from Purbeck District